Stanislav Ivaylov Ivanov (born 16 April 1999) is a Bulgarian professional footballer who plays as a winger for Arda Kardzhali.

Club career
Born in Gabrovo, Ivanov began his football career playing for his hometown club Yantra at the age of six. In 2012, he joined Levski Sofia's youth academy. His first involvement in the first team was after coming on as a substitute and scoring the winning goal in a friendly game against Lazio on 23 May 2014, which finished 3–2.

Ivanov made his competitive debut for Levski at the age of 16 years and 10 months, in a 0–0 home league draw against Montana on 2 March 2016, coming on as a substitute for Miki Orachev. He began to establish himself in the Levski first team from the 2018–19 season, making 11 starts. His first senior goals came on 25 September 2018 when he scored twice in a 6–0 away win over Atletik Kuklen in the first round of the Bulgarian Cup. On 4 May 2019, Ivanov scored his first league goal in a 3–1 away win against Botev Plovdiv. He ended the season with four goals in 20 appearances in all competitions.

Ivanov continued his progress during 2019–20, becoming a regular in the midfield as a right winger. His form led to him being named Best Progressing Player in the Bulgarian First League for 2019. Over the course of the domestic campaign, Ivanov contributed 9 goals and 5 assists for the club.

On 9 December 2020, Stanislav joined Major League Soccer club Chicago Fire. He signed a two-year contract with an option for a further year, taking effect from 1 January 2021. He made his debut for Chicago on 21 July 2021, coming on as a substitute in their 2–2 draw against D.C. United. On 13 January 2023, Ivanov and Chicago mutually agreed to terminate his contract with the club.

International career
Ivanov was called up for the Bulgaria U19 team for the 2017 European Under-19 Championship qualification from 22 to 27 March 2017. After a draw and 2 wins the team qualified for the knockout phase which was held in July 2017.

Career statistics

Honours
Individual
Best Progressing Player in the Bulgarian First League: 2019

References

External links
 
 Profile at Levskisofia.info

Living people
1999 births
People from Gabrovo
Bulgarian footballers
Association football forwards
Bulgaria youth international footballers
First Professional Football League (Bulgaria) players
Major League Soccer players
PFC Levski Sofia players
Chicago Fire FC players
FC Arda Kardzhali players
Bulgarian expatriate footballers
Bulgarian expatriate sportspeople in the United States
Expatriate soccer players in the United States